Arjuna Union is a union of Bhuapur Upazila, Tangail District, Bangladesh. It is situated 36 km north of Tangail.

Demographics

According to Population Census 2011 performed by Bangladesh Bureau of Statistics, The total population of Arjuna union is 26793. There are 6810 households in total.

Education

The literacy rate of Arjuna Union is 41.1% (Male-42.5%, Female-39.8%).

See also
 Union Councils of Tangail District

References

Populated places in Dhaka Division
Populated places in Tangail District
Unions of Bhuapur Upazila